The Sopwith Dragon was a British single-seat fighter biplane developed from the Sopwith Snipe.

Design and development
In April 1918, the sixth Snipe prototype was fitted with a 320 hp (239 kW) ABC Dragonfly I radial engine. To compensate for the greater weight of the Dragonfly, the fuselage was lengthened by 22 in (56 cm).

The prototype suffered persistent ignition system defects, but performance was encouraging when the Dragonfly engine operated properly. In June 1918, the Royal Air Force issued a contract for 30 Dragonfly-engined Snipes, which were subsequently named Dragons. In late November 1918, the RAF cancelled a production order for 300 Snipes and reordered the aircraft as Dragons.

A second prototype was equipped with the larger 360 hp (268 kW) ABC Dragonfly IA engine. This aircraft did not begin official trials at Martlesham Heath until February 1919. It attained a top speed of 150 mph (240 km/h) at sea level and achieved a service ceiling of 25,000 ft.

Sopwith built approximately 200 Dragon airframes, which were placed in storage pending delivery of their engines. Difficulties with the Dragonfly ultimately proved impossible to resolve. Only a few aircraft were completed with Dragonfly engines, and none were issued to squadrons. The Dragon was finally declared obsolete in April 1923.

Operators

Royal Air Force

Specifications

See also

Notes

References

 Bruce, J. M. War Planes of the First World War: Volume Three, Fighters. London: Macdonald, 1969. .
 Davis, Mick. Sopwith Aircraft. Ramsbury, Marlborough, Wiltshire: Crowood Press, 1999. .
 Mason, Francis K. The British Fighter Since 1912. Annapolis, Maryland: Naval Institute Press, 1992. .
 Robertson, Bruce. Sopwith – The Man and His Aircraft. London: Harleyford, 1970. .

1910s British fighter aircraft
Dragon
Single-engined tractor aircraft
Biplanes
Aircraft first flown in 1918